Presidential elections were held in Sri Lanka on 9 November 1994. Nominations were accepted on 7 October 1994 and electoral participation was 70.47%. Prime Minister Chandrika Kumaratunga of the governing People's Alliance was elected, receiving 62% of all votes cast.

Background
President Ranasinghe Premadasa was assassinated in 1993 by the Tamil Tigers and was succeeded by the Prime Minister, Dingiri Banda Wijetunga. President Wijetunga chose not to run in the 1994 election; therefore the United National Party selected Leader of the Opposition Gamini Dissanayake as their candidate. His main challenger was Prime Minister Chandrika Kumaratunga of the People's Alliance, whose party had won the parliamentary elections earlier in 1994.

On 24 October 1994, during his presidential campaign, Gamini Dissanayake was assassinated by the Tamil Tigers. His name on the ballot paper was replaced by his wife Srima Dissanayake.

Results
Kumaratunga won the election by a record margin with 62.28% of the vote.

References

 
 
 

 
Sri Lanka
Presidential elections in Sri Lanka
1994 in Sri Lanka
Sri Lanka